Anna Maria Angelika Jansson (born 13 February 1958) is a Swedish crime writer and nurse from Visby, Gotland. She started her career as a surgeon nurse, but soon went over to the lung clinic due to her frequent fainting from seeing blood.

Jansson began writing novels in 1997 after her family bought a computer. At this time she had worked as a nurse for twenty years, and although she still enjoyed her occupation, she felt it was time to try something new. Jansson commented: "In school I hated writing essays, but then we got a computer at home, and suddenly I discovered that I actually felt happy as I was writing." A contributing factor to Jansson's decision to pursue her career as an author was her patients; she often met patients that were about to die and she was told that they regretted the fact that they had not spent much time in life doing what they really wanted.

The inspiration for Jansson's novels, which deal with crimes, came from the patients she met in her job as a nurse. Jansson's first crime novel to be published was Stum sitter guden in 2000. She had written two novels prior to this one, but failed to find a publisher for them. Jansson did not give up on her career as a nurse, and continued to work part-time at the Örebro Hospital while writing in her free time. Since 2000, she has published at least one novel each year. Her latest ones have sold over 100,000 copies each. In addition to this, Jansson has written a number of children's books.

Jansson's crime novels take place in Gotland and the main character in all of them is criminal inspector Maria Wern. Her 2006 novel Främmande fågel was nominated for a Glass Key award in 2007, and was adapted into a television show by TV4 in 2008.

Despite her now successful career as a writer, Jansson still works part-time as a nurse at Örebro Hospital's lung clinic. She has three children and lives in Vintrosa outside of Örebro.

Bibliography

Translated Crime novels
 2013 – Strange Bird
 2014 – Killer's Island

Crime novels
 2000 – Stum sitter guden
 2001 – Alla de stillsamma döda
 2002 – Må döden sova
 2003 – Silverkronan
 2003 – Dömd för mord
 2004 – Drömmar ur snö
 2005 – Svart fjäril
 2006 – Främmande fågel
 2007 – I stormen ska du dö
 2007 – Pojke försvunnen
 2008 – Inte ens det förflutna
 2008 – Hantverkarsvett är dyrare än saffran
 2009 – Först när givaren är död
 2010 – Drömmen förde dej vilse
 2011 – Alkemins eviga eld
 2012 – När Skönheten kom till Bro
 2013 – Dans på glödande kol
 2014 – Skymningens barfotabarn
 2014 – Ödesgudinnan på Salong d'Amour
 2015 – Alla kan se dig
 2016 – Rädslans fångar
 2017 - Det du inte vet
 2018 - Kvinnan på bänken

Children's books
Ditt och mitt, 2007
Ingen att vara med, 2007
Modigt Mia, 2007
Monster finns, 2007
 Kojan, 2007
 Mia frågar chans, 2007
 Det brinner, 2007
 En varulv, 2007

References

External links
Official website

1958 births
Living people
People from Gotland
Writers from Gotland
Swedish-language writers
Swedish crime fiction writers
Swedish nurses